The raising of the son of the widow of Zarephath is a miracle of the prophet Elijah recorded in the Hebrew Bible, 1 Kings 17, taking place in the Phoenician city of Zarephath.

Background

1 Kings 17 is the chapter in which Elijah is first mentioned by name in the Bible. It states that he is a Tishbite from Gilead, who visited King Ahab to give him a message from God that there would be no rain in the land until he declared it (v1). In order to avoid the wrath of the king, God told Elijah to hide by the Brook Cherith where he was fed bread and meat by ravens sent from God (vv2-6).

After a while, due to the drought, the brook dried up so God told Elijah to go to the town of Sarepta and to seek out a widow that would find him water and food (vv.7-9). Elijah learns that the widow has a son and between them they only have enough flour and oil for one more meal before they die. Despite this, the widow helps Elijah (vv11-14). Because she did this God caused the flour and the oil never to run out (vv15-16). "[The widow had] a handful of meal in a barrel, and a little oil in a cruse ... and the barrel of meal wasted not, neither did the cruse of oil fail". (King James Version).

Elijah, the widow and the widow's son

Victor H. Matthews suggests that the woman "uses sarcasm which is designed to shame the prophet for being the cause of her son's death." Elijah does not try and rationalise with the grieving woman and takes the son up to his bedroom where he prays to God asking for his help. 

He then takes the child downstairs again and presents him, living, to his mother. This causes her to declare "Now by this I know that thou art a man of God" (v24), Elijah therefore "regains his honor and his status."

Rabbi Eliezer ben Hyrcanus, also known as Rabbi Eliezer Hagadol, relates that the son raised by Elijah was none other than the prophet Jonah, most notably associated with the incident involving a giant fish. Commentators have noted verbal parallels with the raising of the son of the widow of Nain in the Gospel of Luke chapter 7. The miracle is represented in the Dura synagogue murals.

References

External links

Resurrection
Books of Kings
Elijah
Women in the Hebrew Bible
Jewish miracles
Widowhood
Gilead
Phoenicians in the New Testament